Ambrose is an unincorporated community of 90 inhabitants in Grayson County, Texas off of U.S. Highway 69 between Bells and Denison.

References 

Grayson County, Texas